Laupen BE railway station is a railway station in the municipality of Laupen, in the Swiss canton of Bern. It is the western terminus of the standard gauge Flamatt–Laupen line of the Sensetalbahn.  The station was relocated in 2021.

History 

Prior to 2021, the station building was located on the Bahnhofstrasse, to the north of the Bösingenstrasse. The new station has a single -long side platform. There is parking space for 243 bicycles, both in front of the station and on the old right-of-way between the platform and the Bösingenstrasse. A gravel path between the station and the river Sense runs from Laupen to Neuenegg. The new station opened, with the rest of the line, in April 2021.

Services 
 the following services stop at Laupen BE:

Images

References

External links 
 
 
 

Railway stations in the canton of Bern
Sensetalbahn stations